Við Djúpumýrar (formerly also known as Injector Arena for sponsorship reasons) is a multi-use stadium in Klaksvík, Faroe Islands. It is mostly used for football matches. Við Djúpumýrar is the home ground of Klaksvíkar Ítróttarfelag men's and women's teams and has an approximate capacity of 2,500 people, with 524 seats. The stadium hosted the Faroe Islands Cup final in 2010 and 2011.

Upgrades in 2019
The stadium is going through a renovation before the 2019 season. The main goal is to get it ready to host international and European matches.

References

External links
Injector Arena at Soccerway

Football venues in the Faroe Islands
Sport in Klaksvík